Harfili (former Cıcık) is a village in Erdemli district of Mersin Province. The population of Harfili was 285  as of 2012. There are ancient ruins around the village. Main economic activities of the village are farming and animal breeding. Tomato, cucumber, peach, cherry and apple are produced. Every year a village festival named "Raw vegetable festival" is held in the village.

References

Villages in Erdemli District
Yaylas in Turkey